Anna is a 1970 Finnish movie co-written by Jörn Donner and Eija-Elina Bergholm, and directed by Donner, featuring Harriet Andersson, Pertti Melasniemi and Marja Packalén. Filmed in Kustavi and Turku, Finland. There was controversy about the nudity in the film. It has been described as "perhaps [Donner's] most thoughtful film", and been listed among "the most important films made in Finland in the 1960s and 1970s".

Plot 
Thirty-eight-year-old Anna Kivi (Harriet Andersson), a Finnish anesthesiologist at Turku University Hospital and divorcée recently awarded a doctorate after her thesis, retreats to a summer studio on an island for the annual national summer holiday where she contemplates modern hardships and Northern European socialism.

References 

1970 films
Finnish drama films
Films directed by Jörn Donner